Nagelmackers is a private bank in Belgium, the oldest in the country and the 14th oldest bank in the world. It focuses on individuals and provides a wide network of independent and integrated offices in Belgium.

History 
Nagelmackers is the oldest Belgian bank, founded in Liège by Pierre Nagelmackers in 1747. During 18th and 19th centuries it was successful as a bank of the Liège industry. In the early 20th century, the first office in Brussels opened.

BNP 
In 1990, after 243 years as an independent bank, Nagelmackers Bank became part of the Banque Nationale de Paris group.

Delta Lloyd 
The name Nagelmackers disappeared from the Belgian streets after a takeover by Delta Lloyd Bank in 2005.

Anbang 
In October 2015 the name was changed back to Bank Nagelmackers after the bank was taken over by Anbang.

Offices 
As of March 2017, Nagelmackers had over 3,800 employees working in 115 branches.

References 

Article contains translated text from Bank Nagelmackers on the Dutch Wikipedia retrieved on 7 March 2017.

External links 

Homepage

Banks of Belgium
Companies based in Brussels
Companies established in the 18th century
Establishments in the Austrian Netherlands
Banks established in 1744
1744 establishments in the Habsburg monarchy
1744 establishments in the Holy Roman Empire